Diablo Valley College (DVC) is a public community college with campuses in Pleasant Hill and San Ramon in Contra Costa County, California. DVC is one of three public community colleges in the Contra Costa Community College District (along with Contra Costa College and Los Medanos College). It opened in 1949. DVC has more than 22,000 students and 300 full-time and 370 part-time instructors.

History
Diablo Valley College was founded in 1949 as East Contra Costa Junior College. The college enrolls over 22,000 students on two sites.

Grade-fixing scandal
In 2007, a six-year grade fixing scheme came to light with allegations that over 70 students used sex or cash as payment to student employees in the admissions and records office in exchange for over 400 grade changes. Many of these students had transferred to universities and in some cases may have already graduated. By November 2007, 49 students had been charged with misdemeanors or felonies over the incident, and at least one had accepted a no contest plea. A spokesperson for the Accrediting Commission for Community and Junior Colleges said that although the scandal was a negative factor it would be unlikely to lead to the school's loss of accreditation.

In the first trial resulting from the grade changes, former student employee Erick Martinez was acquitted of all criminal charges on September 5, 2008. Jurors reached that decision after concluding that prosecutors failed to prove beyond a reasonable doubt that there was a definite link between Martinez and grade changes.

Academics
DVC is a “feeder” college to the University of California, Berkeley; California State University, East Bay; and St. Mary's College. It ranks among the top five transfer colleges in California. In 2004, the top four transfer destinations were California State University, East Bay, San Francisco State University, University of California, Berkeley and University of California, Davis.

DVC also offers a variety of occupational specialties, including hotel/restaurant management, culinary arts, dental technology and real estate. It has an active speech and debating team.

Athletics
DVC offers sports including men's and women's basketball, cross country, swimming and diving, tennis, water polo, baseball, football, lacrosse, track and field (men) and soccer, softball, and volleyball (women).

Willie McGee played baseball for DVC in 1977, and would later win a National League MVP award in 1985. Pitcher Doug Davis also played in the majors from 1999 to 2011.

Demarshay Johnson, a former DVC basketball star who went on to play for the University of Nevada, was named California Community College Athletic Association (CCCAA) first team All-State after the 2004–05 season. That season he led the CCCAA in blocks, averaging 5.2 per game, and was named Bay Valley Conference MVP.

The DVC Viking men's lacrosse program was the first junior college club in California, forming in 2008. In 2013, DVC won the California Junior College Lacrosse Association (CJCLA) championship.

College newspaper
The Inquirer, the college's student-run newspaper, is produced on campus by the Journalism 126 class.

The newspaper was forced to produce its paper off-site at the Contra Costa Times newsroom when a bomb-threat on October 24, 2006, closed the campus and access to the newsroom was restricted.

The Inquirer won General Excellence awards from the Journalism Association of Community Colleges (JACC) in 2006, 2010, 2011 and 2012. The newspaper also won a Pacesetter award from JACC in 1999.

Sponsors
The student union at DVC is named for Margaret Lesher, widow of Dean Lesher, founder of the Contra Costa Times and cofounder of the Margaret and Dean Lesher Foundation.

Notable alumni
In addition to the athletes named above, notable alumni of Diablo Valley include:
 Lauren Beck, film producer
 Daniel James Brown, author of Under a Flaming Sky and The Boys in the Boat
 Kyle Gass, member of Tenacious D
 John Gesek, former NFL player
 Dennis Havrilla, former IFL player
 Eva Marie, model and WWE diva
 Willie McGee, former Major League Baseball outfielder for the St. Louis Cardinals, Oakland Athletics, San Francisco Giants, and Boston Red Sox and 1985 National League MVP
 George Miller, former U.S. Congressman
 Ron Turner, former NFL coach
 Matt Overton, Jacksonville Jaguars long snapper
 Katharine Ross, actress
 Robert Scott, true crime author
 Julie Strain, model and actress
 De'Ondre Wesley, former NFL player
 Timothy P. White, the former chancellor of the University of California, Riverside and seventh chancellor of the California State University system
 Greg Wilson, former CFL player

References

External links

 

California Community Colleges
Universities and colleges in Contra Costa County, California
Educational institutions established in 1949
Schools accredited by the Western Association of Schools and Colleges
1949 establishments in California
Pleasant Hill, California